Paenalcaligenes suwonensis is a Gram-negative, aerobic and non-spore-forming bacterium from the genus Paenalcaligenes which has been isolated from mushroom compost.

References 

 

Burkholderiales
Bacteria described in 2014